This is a list of mayors of Giresun, Turkey, since 1869.

Giresun